Kevin Glover (born June 17, 1963) is a former American football center for the Detroit Lions (1985-1997), and Seattle Seahawks (1998-1999). He attended the University of Maryland. He was a key blocker for Barry Sanders allowing him to excel as one of the greatest rushers in NFL history. During his long pro career he was known as one of the best centers in the game.

College career
Glover was a first-team All-American (The Sporting News) at Maryland in 1984 and a member of the Maryland Athletics Hall of Fame.

National Football League 
Glover was almost drafted by the New England Patriots but was actually selected six picks later by the Lions. He played thirteen years with the Lions, making the Pro Bowl three times.

After the NFL 
In 2007, Glover returned to his alma mater at the University of Maryland and became the Director of Player Development.

References

External links

1963 births
Living people
American football centers
Detroit Lions players
Maryland Terrapins football players
National Conference Pro Bowl players
Seattle Seahawks players
Ed Block Courage Award recipients